State Road 266 (NM 266) is a state highway in the US state of New Mexico. NM 266's western terminus is at the end of state maintenance by San Ignacio, and the eastern terminus is at NM 94 west of Sapello.

Major intersections

See also

References

266
Transportation in San Miguel County, New Mexico